Yohana Daniel Izam  is a Nigerian academician, Vice Chancellor of Plateau State University, and President of the Nigerian Institute of Building. He was previously the Commissioner for Housing and Transport for Plateau State, Nigeria.

Background
Izam was born on 13 January 1967 at Mangu in Plateau State. He graduated from Federal Government College  Wukari and proceeded to attend the University of Jos, graduating with his B.Sc. in Building in 1987. He earned his M.Sc. from the University of Lagos in 1990 and returned to the University of Jos for his PhD in Construction Management, graduating in 2008.

References

Living people
1967 births
People from Plateau State
University of Jos alumni
University of Lagos alumni
Academic staff of the University of Jos